The 2017–18 Niagara Purple Eagles men's basketball team represented Niagara University during the 2017–18 NCAA Division I men's basketball season. The Purple Eagles, led by fifth-year head coach Chris Casey, played their home games at the Gallagher Center in Lewiston, New York as members of the Metro Atlantic Athletic Conference. They finished the season 19–14, 12–6 in MAAC play to finish in third place. They lost in the quarterfinals of the MAAC tournament to Fairfield. They were invited to the CollegeInsider.com Tournament where they lost in the first round to Eastern Michigan.

Previous season 
The Purple Eagles finished the 2016–17 season 10–23, 6–14 in MAAC play to finish in ninth place. They defeated Quinnipiac in the first round of the MAAC tournament to advance to the quarterfinals where they lost to Monmouth.

Roster

Schedule and results

|-
!colspan=9 style=| Exhibition

|-
!colspan=9 style=| Non-conference regular season

|-
!colspan=9 style=| MAAC regular season

|-
!colspan=9 style=| MAAC tournament

|-
!colspan=9 style=| CIT

References

Niagara Purple Eagles men's basketball seasons
Niagara
Niagara
Niagara
Niagara